Wii Chess is a chess video game for the Wii console. It was developed by Nintendo and was released on January 18, 2008, in Europe as a budget-priced retail title. Under the name , it was released as a downloadable WiiWare title in Japan on September 30, 2008. The game was never released in North America or Australia, making it the only game in the Wii series that was not released in those continents. It is also the only game in the series that do not have playable Mii characters.

Wii Chess uses the Loop Express chess engine.

Gameplay

The game is played using the Wii Remote. However, instead of the pointer function, chess pieces are moved across the board using the D-pad on the controller.

The game features an option that gives players new to chess instructions on how each piece should move across the board. Players are also able to record and replay their games at a later time. Players could also play online against other players courtesy of the Nintendo Wi-Fi Connection, with Wii Chess players being able to compete against players of World Chess and vice versa.

Reception

Official Nintendo Magazine UK gave the game 78%. They praised the great online multiplayer and how the game plays a "perfect game". Their main criticisms were the bland visuals and the fact it will not capture the imaginations of people who do not like chess. Eurogamer gave the game 7/10, citing that it features a number of "sensible options", but notes that it misses features that would more than justify the price of the game.

References

External links
Official UK site
World Chess Japanese site

2008 video games
Chess software
Nintendo games
Nintendo Wi-Fi Connection games
Touch! Generations
Video games developed in Japan
Wii-only games
Wii Wi-Fi games
WiiWare games
Multiplayer and single-player video games